Količevo is a settlement on the left bank of the Kamnik Bistrica River north of Domžale in the Upper Carniola region of Slovenia. Urbanization has meant that Količevo is rapidly becoming a suburb of Domžale, rather than a distinct separate settlement.

References

External links

Količevo on Geopedia

Populated places in the Municipality of Domžale